The Building Cost Information Service (BCIS), provides cost and price data for the UK construction industry. 
BCIS offer trusted and reliable information from a wide range of property and construction related sources. From insurance to infrastructure, asset and facilities management to construction early cost advice, it delivers independent data to help increase cost and performance certainty whilst helping manage and mitigate risk.

History 
For over 60 years, BCIS has been collecting, collating, analysing, modelling and interpreting cost information. BCIS make that information easily accessible through online applications, data licensing and publications. It also provides consultancy and research support to clients from both the public and private sector.

References
Website:https://bcis.co.uk/

Construction organizations